Darrel Keith Brown (March 14, 1923 – October 7, 1990) was an American professional basketball player.

Brown played collegiately for the College of the Pacific and Humboldt State University. He was selected by the Baltimore Bullets in the 1948 BAA draft, and played three games for the Bullets during the 1948–49 BAA season.

BAA career statistics

Regular season

References

External links

1923 births
1990 deaths
American men's basketball players
Baltimore Bullets (1944–1954) draft picks
Baltimore Bullets (1944–1954) players
Cal Poly Humboldt Lumberjacks men's basketball players
Pacific Tigers men's basketball players
Forwards (basketball)